Kukava is a settlement on the western edge of the Slovene Hills in the Municipality of Juršinci in northeastern Slovenia. The area is part of the traditional region of Styria and is now included with the rest of the municipality in the Drava Statistical Region.

A small chapel-shrine with a belfry in the settlement was built in 1931 on the site of an older church demolished in the late 18th century.

References

External links
Kukava on Geopedia

Populated places in the Municipality of Juršinci